James Nolan may refer to:
 James Nolan (athlete) (born 1977), Irish athlete and athletics coach
 Jim Nolan (theatre director) (born 1958), Irish theatre director
 James Nolan (author), American poet and writer of fiction
 Jim Nolan (basketball) (1927–1983), American NBA player
 Jim Nolan (Gaelic football), County Cork Gaelic Athletic Association selector
 Jim Nolan, a fictional character in John Steinbeck's novel In Dubious Battle
 James Thomas Nolan (1926–2018), American actor known professionally as James Greene
 James F. Nolan (1915–1985), American actor
 James Nolan Jr. (1918–2004), news announcer and host of Uncle Jimmy's Clubhouse
 Jimmy Nolan (footballer) (1893–1973), Australian footballer
 James Nolan (criminal), Irish criminal whose brother confessed to killing him
 James Nolan (politician), American politician from Alaska